Kshetrapal Dada is worshiped by many sub-castes (Nukh) of the  Dasnaam Goswami Samaj  & Lohana community as a Kuladevata. A famous temple of Kshetrapal Dada is located at  Lakhiyarvira Kutch & Sami, Gujarat.

Regional Hindu gods